Man on the Moon is a 2006 television opera in one act by Jonathan Dove with a libretto by Nicholas Wright.  It relates the story of the Apollo 11 Moon landing on 20 July 1969 and the subsequent problems experienced by Buzz Aldrin, the second man to walk on the Moon.

The opera, about 50 minutes long, was commissioned by Channel 4 and first shown on 26 December 2006.  The director was Rupert Edwards.  In 2007, it won the Opera Special Prize at the 2007 Festival Rose d'Or in Lucerne, Switzerland.

Roles

Synopsis
The opera chronicles the preparations for the Apollo 11 mission, the journey and the landing.  But it also deals with Aldrin's marriage break-up and the short-lived nature of fame.

See also
 Apollo 11 in popular culture

References

External links

Operas by Jonathan Dove
One-act operas
English-language operas
2006 operas
Operas for television
Operas set in the 20th century
Operas based on real people
Operas set in the United States
Plays by Nicholas Wright
Cultural depictions of Buzz Aldrin
Operas set on the Moon
Aviation plays and operas